Nancy Worley (November 7, 1951 – December 29, 2021) was an American Democratic politician who served as Secretary of State of Alabama from 2003 to 2007 and Chairman of the Alabama Democratic Party from 2013 to 2019.

Early life and education
Worley was born in New Hope, Alabama on November 7, 1951. 

She received a B.A. degree from the University of Montevallo and an M.A. from Jacksonville State University.

Career
Worley served on many commissions across the state of Alabama as an advocate for educators and women. She taught for 25 years in the Decatur School System, and served two terms as the president of the Alabama Education Association (AEA) from 1983-1984 and 1995-1997. She won various teaching awards including Teacher of the Year; a Teacher Hall of Fame nominee; honored by the Alabama Jaycees as Alabama’s Outstanding Young Educator; and Good Housekeeping’s "100 Young Women of Promise."

She served as Alabama Secretary of State from 2003 to 2007. In the 2006 general election, she was defeated for re-election by then-State Auditor Beth Chapman. Worley's tenure as Secretary of State included substantial reforms, including longer and uniform polling hours, voter identification, and automatic recounts in close races.

She was elected in 2013 by the Alabama Democratic Party to be chairwoman of the party in the Republican-dominated state, having previously served as interim Chair since April 2013 and Vice Chair since January 2007.

In July 2015, Worley, five other former AEA presidents, and former AEA Associate Executive Secretary Joe L. Reed, accused the National Education Association of violating its bylaws and overstepping its role in regards to the AEA.

Legal issues and removal as chair
Worley was indicted by a Montgomery County grand jury in March 2007 on five misdemeanor and one felony charge. The charges, resulting from an investigation by Alabama Attorney General Troy King, accused Worley of soliciting support from five of her employees during her unsuccessful re-election campaign in 2006. A few days after the trial started, the presiding judge dropped the felony charge, and indefinitely postponed the trial of related misdemeanor charges. In October 2012, Worley pleaded guilty via a "best interest" plea on one misdemeanor count and agreed to pay a $100 fine. Worley's lawyers revealed a letter, sent by State Treasurer Kay Ivey to her employees, soliciting campaign contributions for the 2008 presidential campaign of former Massachusetts Governor Mitt Romney. Ivey was the Alabama chairwoman of Romney's campaign. Worley's lawyers pointed out that King had not prosecuted fellow Republican Ivey, as he had Worley.

In August 2019, Worley and Randy Kelley, state party's deputy chair, were stripped of their credentials as members of the Democratic National Committee for not complying with DNC demands for revisions to the Alabama Democratic Party's bylaws. On November 2, 2019, Worley was removed as the chair with a unanimous vote.

Death
On December 20, 2021, it was reported that Worley was gravely ill and on life support in a Montgomery hospital. She died on December 29, at the age of 70.

References

|-

1951 births
2021 deaths
21st-century American women politicians
Alabama Democratic Party chairs
Alabama Democrats
National Education Association people
People from Madison County, Alabama
Secretaries of State of Alabama
Women state constitutional officers of Alabama
Educators from Alabama
20th-century American women educators
University of Montevallo alumni
Jacksonville State University alumni
Trade unionists from Alabama
21st-century American politicians
20th-century American educators